McDroid is a tower defense video game developed by the French and American independent studio Elefantopia. The game uses cel shaded graphics.

Gameplay
McDroid is a tower defense game.

Story
McDroid returns home to Planet M and finds a message from Somanto corp (home of the whale dental bleaching laser, chromosomic DRM and Planetary Core Replacement Device) – and the planet is now a mess. Someone didn't read the fine prints. Now it is up to McDroid to heal his beloved planet.

Release
Before its release, the developers sold pre-orders for the game that included access to a beta. This beta was also sold as pay-what-you-want through IndieGameStand.

References

2012 video games
Multiplayer and single-player video games
Windows games
Linux games
MacOS games
PlayStation 4 games
Xbox One games
Tower defense video games
Video games developed in France
Video games developed in the United States